Trond Frønes (born 1978 in Trondheim, Norway) is a Norwegian (bass guitarist), known from bands like Blood on Wheels, Goat The Head, Grand General and Sunswitch.

Career
Frønes has collaborated with musicians like Ola Kvernberg, Even Helte Hermansen, Erlend Slettevoll and Kenneth Kapstad, and had a central position in the Norwegian band Cadillac and Jerryville from 1999.

Discography

Within Cadillac
2001: Cure (Progress Records)
2002: Convertible Candy (Progress Records)
2004: Magnetic City (Kong Tiki)

Within Goat The Head
2010: Doppelgängers (Aftermath Music)
2011: Wicked Mimicry (Left Horn Records)

Within Blood on Wheels
2012: Blood on Wheels (Left Horn Records)

Within Sunswitch
2012: Sunswitch (Riot Factory)

Within Grand General
2013: Grand General (Rune Grammofon)

With Gunnhild Sundli
2013: Tankerop (EMI Music Norway)

References

External links 
Hot Cargo live in Bergen 1992 playing "Til Jaco" on YouTube

Norwegian male bass guitarists
Musicians from Trondheim
1978 births
Living people
21st-century Norwegian bass guitarists
21st-century Norwegian male musicians
Grand General (band) members